Guillaume André Villoteau (19 September 1759 in Bellême – 27 April 1839 in Tours) was a French musicologist.

Biography 
An ambulant musician, engaged in the dragons, Villoteau then integrated the mastery of Notre Dame de Paris on the eve of the French Revolution. He left the orders and entered the Paris Opera during the Reign of Terror where he became conductor of the choir.

The singer François Lays having refused to leave, he took his place in the Commission des sciences et des arts which accompanied the army of the East during the French campaign in Egypt and Syria by Bonaparte.

Villoteau was particularly interested in Arabic music. He started from scratch and could not rely on any music score: his interlocutors benefited only from an oral transmission.

He had the opportunity to carry out his musical research until Philæ, and collected a valuable collection of instruments bought by his friend François-Joseph Fétis and donated to the Museum of Music of Brussels. His contributions to music form 505 pages in the Imperial edition in folio of the Description de l'Égypte and 1015 pages in the Panckoucke edition. It will be a real treatise on Egyptian music, past and present.

On his return to France, he retired in 1809 to his property of the Mazerais, a commune of Savonnières, where he became mayor from 1813 to 1815. He then moved to Tours where he set up the first mutual school in the city.

Selected publications 
 Recherches sur l'analogie de la musique avec les arts, v. I y v. II, Paris: Imperial edition, 1807
 Dissertation sur les diverses espèces d'instruments de musique que l'on remarque parmi les sculptures qui décorent les antiques monuments de l'Égypte. In Description de l'Égypte, Paris: Prunelle, Imperial edition, 1809, p. 181.
 Description historique, technique et littéraire des instruments de musique des Orientaux, Paris: Imperial edition, 1813
 De l'état actuel de l'art musical en Egypte. Relation historique et descriptive des recherches et observations faites sur la musique en ce pays. In Description de l'Égypte, Paris: Panckoucke, 1827.
 Musique de l'antique Egypte, Brussels: Degreef-Laduron, 1830.

Bibliography 
 Fétis (Jean-François), "Villoteau", in Dictionnaire universelle des musiciens, Bruxelles, 1844, vol. 8, p. 459–464.
 Mayaud (Isabelle), "Guillaume-André Villoteau (1759–1839) et l'Égypte : l'expérience d'une vie", in Voyages et voyageurs, circulation des hommes et des idées à l'époque révolutionnaire, actes du 130e congrès des sociétés savantes, La Rochelle, April 2005, p. 121132.
 Grinevald (Paul-Marie), "Villoteau, ethno-musicien de Bonaparte et de l’Égypte", Touraine Généalogie, Bulletin n° 92, 4th trimester 2012, p. 398.
 Grinevald (Paul-Marie), [http://www.editions-harmattan.fr/index.asp?navig=catalogue&obj=livre&no=43281 Guillaume-André Villoteau (1759-1839): Ethnomusicographe de l'Égypte], Paris, L'Harmattan, 2014. 302 p. (series: L'Univers musical).

References

External links 
 Guillaume-André Villoteau (1759-1839) et l'Égypte
 Guillaume-André Villoteau (in English)
 Villoteau, Guillaume André (1759 - 1839), writer on music on Oxford Index
 Villoteau, l’ethno-musicien bonapartiste de la musique égyptienne on Influences (26 April 2012)
  Guillaume-André Villoteau (1759-1839) : ethnomusicographe de l'Égypte on Stanford University Libraries
 Guillaume-André Villoteau / François-Joseph Fétis (biography) on Library of Congress

19th-century French musicologists
French ethnomusicologists
Arabic music
Commission des Sciences et des Arts members
Writers from Normandy
1759 births
1839 deaths